Osbern Putnam "Diddy" Willson (January 17, 1911 – January 19, 1961) was an American football guard who played three seasons with the Philadelphia Eagles of the National Football League (NFL). He played college football at the University of Pennsylvania and attended Oakfield High School in Oakfield, New York.

College career
Willson lettered in football for the Penn Quakers from 1930 to 1932. He also played water polo and lacrosse for the Quakers.

Professional career
Willson played in 28 games, starting 22, for the NFL's Philadelphia Eagles from 1933 to 1935.

References

External links
Just Sports Stats

1911 births
1961 deaths
Players of American football from Pennsylvania
American football guards
Penn Quakers football players
Penn Quakers men's water polo players
Penn Quakers men's lacrosse players
Philadelphia Eagles players
American male water polo players
American lacrosse players